Ryan Russell (born 6 July 1983) is a Jamaican former professional tennis player.

Russell, a left-handed player from Montego Bay, is the son of tennis player Richard Russell and was trained at the Nick Bollettieri academy in Florida. Highly ranked in junior tennis, he was a junior Wimbledon doubles semi-finalist and debuted for the Jamaica Davis Cup team as a 16-year old. He played in the Davis Cup until 2007, amassing a record 20 singles wins. His only ATP Tour main draw appearance came in doubles at the 2002 Hall of Fame Championships in Newport and he won six ITF Futures doubles titles during his career.

ITF Futures titles

Doubles: (6)

References

External links
 
 
 

1983 births
Living people
Jamaican male tennis players
People from Montego Bay